Whitwell and Reepham railway station, also known as Whitwell station, is a former station situated in Norfolk, England. The station closed in 1959 and is a notable stop on the Marriott's Way long-distance footpath. It is being restored as a railway museum, including the re-laying of track.

History
The station was opened in 1882 as part of the Midland and Great Northern Joint Railway's (M&GN) branch from the main line at Melton Constable to Norwich City. Whilst the route was fairly well-used, it struggled under the competition from the larger Great Eastern Railway and its more direct lines. Only one year prior to opening, the Great Eastern had inaugurated its own station at Reepham which, unlike Whitwell, was conveniently sited to the settlement it purported to serve.

The M&GN suffered in the post-Second World War period which saw much freight transfer to road and greater car ownership, leaving the line with its summer and schools traffic. In the face of spiralling losses, British Rail made the decision to close the majority of the line, leaving Whitwell open for freight until 1964. The track through the station remained, however, down until 1985 for the purposes of concrete product movements to neighbouring Lenwade railway station. The station site itself was variously used post-closure as a tree surgery, offices, the parking of coaches and a workshop and garage. Following the lifting of the track through the station, the trackbed was reused as part of the Marriott's Way from 1993.

At one point there was a proposal to dismantle the station building and re-erect it at Holt station on the North Norfolk Railway, but the M&GN station from Stalham was chosen instead.

Revival

Sale of the land by Norfolk County Council
After years of lying derelict, the intact station buildings were offered for sale in 2006 for £250,000 by their owners Norfolk County Council. In the event of it failing to sell, the County Council had earmarked it as the possible location of a travellers' site. It was, however, acquired by the Wyatts who planned to establish an alpaca colony on the site and applied to Broadland District Council for permission to convert the station into a residence and reuse the goods shed as a workshop and storage area. Councillors approved the application in April 2007 notwithstanding the recommendations of planning officers to refuse it.

Acquisition by Mike Urry
The station was put back on the market in Summer 2007 at a guide price of £300,000 - £350,000 but failed to attract a buyer. It was purchased in September 2007 by rail enthusiast Mike Urry who planned to restore the station and relay track. The new owner announced his plans on the project's web site, indicating that he intended to establish a small museum on the site.

Whitwell & Reepham Railway Preservation Society Limited

Having formed the Whitwell & Reepham Railway Preservation Society Limited (with 100 members as of November 2008), Mike Urry has planned the project's future in three phases. Phase one involves returning the station to its original layout by re-laying track and restoring the station buildings. Phase two is to extend the line along Marriott's Way to re-create the  Themelthorpe curve to Reepham railway station. Phase three would entail linking up with either the North Norfolk Railway or Mid Norfolk Railway.

By September 2008,  of track (donated by the Spa Valley Railway) had been laid in the yard and to the former goods shed which will serve as the designated engine shed. A Baguley-Drewry diesel shunter, two Mk I coaches, a Bogie 'B' luggage van and a British Rail four-wheel van have already been delivered to the site. In addition, an original M&GN hand crane (from Holbeach station) has been loaned by the North Norfolk Railway.  An Andrew Barclay 0-4-0 saddle tank was delivered to the site on 23 March 2009.

By May 2010, most of the station-side platform had been resurfaced and the fencing was going up. After being granted £70,000 the engine shed was being renovated with new doors and windows. An extra line had been completed along the cattle platform and was serving as storage line for stock.

Public opening

Although restoration efforts were still ongoing, the station saw steam return on 28 February 2009, the 50th anniversary of the closure of the M&GN, when Peckett 0-6-0ST No. 2000 visited from Barrow hill Roundhouse
The line also launched its appeal for £20,000 to finance a new steam engine for the railway. It is estimated that 6000 turned up over the two weekends of the gala. A reunion of former users of the line also took place.

Top Field Light Railway 
Opened 2016 the site now features a 7 1/4 gauge railway located up on the top field camp site. Currently working on Phase 1 of the project the railway hopes to extend right around the camp site. Home to Stafford class “Tihany” and LNER K2 Loch Ranoch. Operating steam and diesel services April to October every first Sunday of the month.

Signal box

See also
Bressingham Steam and Gardens
Bure Valley Railway
Mid-Norfolk Railway
North Norfolk Railway
Wells and Walsingham Light Railway
Yaxham Light Railway
Barton House Railway

References

External links

  Whitwell railway station
  Disused stations
 Whitwell station on navigable 1946 O. S. map

Heritage railway stations in Norfolk
Railway stations in Great Britain opened in 1882
Railway stations in Great Britain closed in 1959
Former Midland and Great Northern Joint Railway stations
Heritage railways in Norfolk
Railway museums in England
Museums in Norfolk